The 1972 United States presidential election in Ohio took place on November 7, 1972. All 50 states and the District of Columbia were part of the 1972 United States presidential election. State voters chose 25 electors to the Electoral College, who voted for president and vice president.

Ohio was won by incumbent President Richard Nixon (R) by a margin of 21.56%. Nixon won every county in the state except Lucas and Athens Counties, which McGovern won by only 0.95% and 1.22% respectively, and gained a majority in all eighty-six winning counties except Cuyahoga, Mahoning and Summit Counties. Nixon's biggest win was in Union County where he obtained 75.89 percent of the vote. Nonetheless, this result made Ohio almost 2% more Democratic than the nation-at-large.

This was the last occasion until 2012 that Belmont, Jefferson and Monroe Counties voted for a Republican presidential candidate, the last until 2016 that Trumbull County would vote Republican, the last until 2020 that Mahoning County would do so, and remains the last to date where Cuyahoga County has supported the Republican candidate.

Results

Results by county

See also
 United States presidential elections in Ohio

Notes

References

Ohio
1972
1972 Ohio elections